Greg Lazarus is the pen name of South African husband-and-wife writing duo Greg Fried and Lisa Lazarus. Greg Lazarus is the author of the novels Paradise and When in Broad Daylight I Open my Eyes, and the couple have also published the memoir The Book of Jacob.

Life
Greg Fried is a philosopher at the University of Cape Town, and holds a PhD from Trinity College. He has previously worked as an IT consultant, a business writer and a writer of school mathematics textbooks.

Lisa Lazarus is a psychologist and freelance writer. She has a master's degree in educational psychology and a higher diploma in education, and recently completed her master's degree in creative writing the University of Cape Town.

Greg Fried and Lisa Lazarus live in Cape Town, with their two sons, Joshua and Jacob.

Works
Paradise (Kwela Books, 2014)

When in Broad Daylight I Open my Eyes (Kwela Books, 2012)

As Greg Fried and Lisa Lazarus: The Book of Jacob: A Journey into Parenthood (2009)

See also
 List of South Africans
 List of South African writers

External links 
 Greg Lazarus official blog
 Greg Lazarus at Books LIVE
 Kwela Books

References

20th-century South African writers
20th-century South African novelists